The Jindong Formation is a geological formation located in South Korea. It dates to the Cenomanian stage of the Late Cretaceous, with a maximum depositional age of 99.9 ± 0.7 Ma.

Lithology 
The formation is a thick layering of fine-grained, altered volcaniclastic sediments. Most of these sediments are ash-rich mudstone, siltstone, and very fine sandstone. There is also coarser sandstone, conglomerate, carbonates, and ash tuff.

Paleontology 
The area has many dinosaur and bird tracks. It contains Hadrosauropodus kyoungsookimi, the first trackway of a quadrupedal ornithopod discovered in Korea.

See also 
 List of fossil sites

References 

Geologic formations of South Korea
Upper Cretaceous Series of Asia
Cretaceous South Korea
Cenomanian Stage
Mudstone formations
Siltstone formations
Tuff formations
Fluvial deposits
Lacustrine deposits
Ichnofossiliferous formations
Paleontology in South Korea